The 1886 Kansas City Cowboys was a season in American baseball. The team had a 30–91 record in the National League, finishing in seventh place. This was the only season this version of the team existed, as the team went bankrupt before the 1887 season.

Regular season

Season standings

Record vs. opponents

Roster

Player stats

Batting

Starters by position 
Note: Pos = Position; G = Games played; AB = At bats; H = Hits; Avg. = Batting average; HR = Home runs; RBI = Runs batted in

Other batters 
Note: G = Games played; AB = At bats; H = Hits; Avg. = Batting average; HR = Home runs; RBI = Runs batted in

Pitching

Starting pitchers 
Note: G = Games pitched; IP = Innings pitched; W = Wins; L = Losses; ERA = Earned run average; SO = Strikeouts

Relief pitchers 
Note: G = Games pitched; IP = Innings pitched; W = Wins; L = Losses; ERA = Earned run average; SO = Strikeouts

References 
 1886 Kansas City Cowboys team page at Baseball Reference

Kansas City Cowboys season
Kansas City Cowboys
Kansas City Cowboys